Kamal Al-Athari (born 18 July 1959) is a Kuwaiti judoka. He competed in the men's lightweight event at the 1976 Summer Olympics.

References

External links
 

1959 births
Living people
Kuwaiti male judoka
Olympic judoka of Kuwait
Judoka at the 1976 Summer Olympics
Place of birth missing (living people)